UNP may refer to:

Politics
Ukrains'ka Narodna Partiya, a political party in Ukraine
United National Party, a political party in Sri Lanka
United Nationalist Party, a former political party in Ghana
United Newfoundland Party, a former political party in Newfoundland, Canada
United Nigerian Party, which merged into the United Nigeria Congress Party

Others
Unp, an abbreviation of the previous name, unnilpentium, for the chemical element Dubnium
A synonym for the enzyme USP4
The NYSE listing for the Union Pacific Corporation
United National Photographers, a British photography agency
Unified Network Platform, an open platform computing architecture
National University of the Patagonia San Juan Bosco (Universidad Nacional de la Patagonia San Juan Bosco) in Argentina
State University of Padang (Universitas Negeri Padang), a university in Indonesia
University of Northern Philippines, a public university in Ilocos Sur province
University Nanosatellite Program
UNpriviledged Ports, a network terminology for ports in the range 1024-65655